Kim Jeong-hun or Kim Jŏng-hun (김정훈) may refer to:
Kim Jong-hun (footballer, born 1956), North Korean football player
Kim Jeong-hoon (born 1980), South Korean singer and actor
Kim Jung-hoon (table tennis), South Korean table tennis player
Kim Jung-hoon (footballer, born 1989), South Korean football player
Kim Jeong-hoon (footballer, born 1991), South Korean football player

See also
Jeong H. Kim (김종훈; born 1960) is a Korean-American entrepreneur
Kim Jong-hun (disambiguation) (김종훈)